In fluid mechanics, Kelvin's circulation theorem (named after William Thomson, 1st Baron Kelvin who published it in 1869) states:In a barotropic, ideal fluid with conservative body forces, the circulation around a closed curve (which encloses the same fluid elements) moving with the fluid remains constant with time.

Stated mathematically:

where  is the circulation around a material contour  Stated more simply, this theorem says that if one observes a closed contour at one instant, and follows the contour over time (by following the motion of all of its fluid elements), the circulation over the two locations of this contour are equal.

This theorem does not hold in cases with viscous stresses, nonconservative body forces (for example the Coriolis force) or non-barotropic pressure-density relations.

Mathematical proof

The circulation  around a closed material contour  is defined by:

where u is the velocity vector, and ds is an element along the closed contour.

The governing equation for an inviscid fluid with a conservative body force is

where D/Dt is the convective derivative, ρ is the fluid density, p is the pressure and Φ is the potential for the body force. These are the Euler equations with a body force.

The condition of barotropicity implies that the density is a function only of the pressure, i.e. .

Taking the convective derivative of circulation gives

For the first term, we substitute from the governing equation, and then apply Stokes' theorem, thus:

The final equality arises since  owing to barotropicity.

For the second term, we note that evolution of the material line element is given by

Hence

The last equality is obtained by applying gradient theorem.

Since both terms are zero, we obtain the result

Poincaré–Bjerknes circulation theorem 
A similar principle which conserves a quantity can be obtained for the rotating frame also, known as the Poincaré–Bjerknes theorem, named after Henri Poincaré and Vilhelm Bjerknes, who derived the invariant in 1893 and 1898. The theorem can be applied to a rotating frame which is rotating at a constant angular velocity given by the vector , for the modified circulation

Here  is the position of the area of fluid. From Stokes' theorem, this is:

The Vorticity of a velocity field in fluid dynamics is defined by:

Then:

See also
Bernoulli's principle
Euler equations (fluid dynamics)
Helmholtz's theorems
Thermomagnetic convection

Notes

Equations of fluid dynamics
Fluid dynamics
Equations
Circulation theorem